Kendrick Lamar Duckworth (born June 17, 1987) is an American rapper and songwriter. Known for his progressive musical styles and socially conscious songwriting, he is often considered one of the most influential hip hop artists of his generation. Born and raised in Compton, California, Lamar began his career as a teenager performing under the stage name K.Dot. He quickly garnered local attention which led to him signing a recording contract with Top Dawg Entertainment (TDE) in 2005.

After becoming a founding member of the hip hop supergroup Black Hippy, Lamar dropped his stage name and started using his first and middle names professionally. In 2011, he released his debut studio album Section.80, a conscious hip hop record. The album was met with positive reviews and included his debut single "HiiiiPower". In 2012, Lamar secured a record deal with Dr. Dre’s Aftermath Entertainment, under the aegis of Interscope Records, and released his second studio album Good Kid, M.A.A.D City. The West Coast and gangsta rap influenced album garnered widespread critical recognition and commercial success, while including the singles "Swimming Pools (Drank)," "Backseat Freestyle," and "Bitch, Don't Kill My Vibe".

A visit to South Africa inspired Lamar’s jazz-flavored third studio album To Pimp a Butterfly (2015). It received universal acclaim and became his first number-one album on the Billboard 200. The same year, he topped the Billboard Hot 100 for the first time with the remix of "Bad Blood" by Taylor Swift. Lamar experimented with R&B, pop and psychedelic soul in his fourth studio album Damn (2017). It spawned his first solo number-one single "Humble" and became the first non-classical and non-jazz work to be awarded the Pulitzer Prize for Music. Following a four-year hiatus, Lamar released his fifth studio album Mr. Morale & the Big Steppers (2022), which served as his swan song from TDE. He has directed and produced several music videos and films with his creative partner Dave Free, with whom he founded the creative collective PGLang.

Having sold over 70 million records in the United States alone, all of Lamar’s studio albums have been certified platinum or higher by the Recording Industry Association of America (RIAA). He has received numerous accolades throughout his career, including 17 Grammy Awards, a Primetime Emmy Award, two American Music Awards, six Billboard Music Awards, 11 MTV Video Music Awards, a Brit Award, and a nomination for an Academy Award. He was named MTV’s Hottest MC in the Game in 2012. In 2015, Lamar received the California State Senate’s Generational Icon Award. He has been featured in listicles such as the Time 100 and Forbes 30 Under 30. Three of his studio albums were included on Rolling Stone’s 2020 ranking of the 500 Greatest Albums of All Time.

Early life 
Kendrick Lamar Duckworth was born in Compton, California, on June 17, 1987, the son of a couple from Chicago. Although not in a gang himself, he grew up around gang members; with his closest friends being Westside Piru Bloods and his father, Kenny Duckworth, being a Gangster Disciple. His first name was given to him by his mother, Paula Oliver, in honor of singer-songwriter Eddie Kendricks of The Temptations. He grew up on welfare and in Section 8 housing.

In 1995, at the age of eight, Lamar witnessed Tupac Shakur and Dr. Dre film the music video for their single "California Love," which proved to be a significant moment in his life. As a child, he attended McNair Elementary and Vanguard Learning Center in the Compton Unified School District. He has admitted to being quiet and shy in school, his mother confirming he was a "loner" until the age of seven. Lamar was further educated at Centennial High School, where he graduated in 2005 as a straight-A student.

Career

2003–2009: Career beginnings

In 2003, at the age of 16, Lamar released his first full-length project, a mixtape titled Youngest Head Nigga in Charge (Hub City Threat: Minor of the Year), under the pseudonym K.Dot. The mixtape was released under Konkrete Jungle Muzik and garnered local recognition for Lamar. The mixtape led to Lamar securing a recording contract with Top Dawg Entertainment (TDE), a newly founded independent record label based in Carson, California. He began recording material with the label and subsequently released a 26-track mixtape two years later, titled Training Day (2005).

Throughout 2006 and 2007, Lamar would appear alongside other up-and-coming West Coast rappers, such as Jay Rock and Ya Boy, as opening acts for veteran West Coast rapper The Game. Under the moniker K.Dot, Lamar was also featured on The Game's songs "The Cypha" and "Cali Niggaz".

After receiving a co-sign from Lil Wayne, Lamar released his third mixtape in 2009, titled C4, which was heavily themed around Wayne's album Tha Carter III. Soon after, Lamar decided to no longer go by the stage name of K.Dot and opted to use his birth name. He subsequently released a self-titled extended play in late 2009. That same year, Lamar along with his TDE label-mates Jay Rock, Ab-Soul and ScHoolboy Q formed Black Hippy, a hip hop supergroup.

2010–2011: Overly Dedicated and Section.80

Throughout 2010, Lamar toured with Tech N9ne and Jay Rock on The Independent Grind tour. On September 14, 2010, he released the visuals for "P&P 1.5," a song taken from his mixtape, Overly Dedicated, featuring his Black Hippy cohort Ab-Soul. On the same date, Lamar released Overly Dedicated to digital retailers under TDE, and later on September 23, released it for free online. The project fared well enough to enter the United States Billboard Top R&B/Hip-Hop Albums chart, where it peaked at number 72.

The mixtape includes a song titled "Ignorance Is Bliss," in which Lamar highlights gangsta rap and street crime, but ends each verse with "ignorance is bliss," giving the message "we know not what we do;" it was this song specifically that made hip hop producer Dr. Dre want to work with Lamar after seeing the music video on YouTube. This, and a conversation between Dre and J. Cole. J Cole helped introduce Lamar to Dre which led to Lamar working with Dr. Dre and Snoop Dogg on Dre's often-delayed Detox album, as well as speculation of Lamar signing to Dr. Dre's record label, Aftermath Entertainment. In December 2010, Complex magazine spotlighted Lamar in an edition of their "Indie Intro" series.

In early 2011, Lamar was included in XXL's annual Top 10 Freshman Class, and was featured on the cover alongside fellow up-and-coming rappers Cyhi the Prynce, Meek Mill, Fred the Godson, Mac Miller, Yelawolf and Big K.R.I.T., Lil B, and Diggy Simmons. On April 11, 2011, Lamar announced the title of his next full-length project to be Section.80, and the following day the first single "HiiiPoWeR" was released, the concept of which was to further explain the HiiiPoWeR movement. The song was produced by fellow American rapper J. Cole, marking their first of several collaborations.

On the topic of whether his next project would be an album or a mixtape, Lamar answered: "I treat every project like it's an album anyway. It's not going to be nothing leftover. I never do nothing like that. These are my leftover songs you all can have them. I'm going to put my best out. My best effort. I'm trying to look for an album in 2012." In June 2011, Lamar released "Ronald Reagan Era (His Evils)," a cut from Section.80, featuring Wu-Tang Clan leader RZA. On July 2, 2011, Lamar released Section.80, his debut studio album. The album features guest appearances from GLC, Colin Munroe, Schoolboy Q, and Ab-Soul, while the production was handled by TDE in-house production team Digi+Phonics as well as Wyldfyer, Terrace Martin and J. Cole. Section.80 went on to sell 5,300 digital copies in its first week, without any television or radio coverage, and received mostly positive reviews.

In August 2011, while performing at a West Los Angeles concert, Lamar was dubbed the "New King of the West Coast" by Snoop Dogg, Dr. Dre and Game. On August 24, 2011, Lamar released the music video for the Section.80 track, "ADHD". The video was directed by Vashtie Kola who had this to say of the video: "Inspired by "A.D.H.D"'s dark beat and melancholy lyrics which explore a generation in conflict, we find Kendrick Lamar in a video that illustrates the songs[sic] universal and age-old theme of apathetic youth. (...) Shot in New York City during the sweltering July Summer heat". In October 2011, Lamar appeared alongside fellow American rappers B.o.B, Tech N9ne, MGK, and Big K.R.I.T., in a cypher at the BET Hip Hop Awards. Also in October, Lamar partnered with Windows Phone, and crafted an original song with producer Nosaj Thing entitled "Cloud 10," to promote Microsoft's new product. During 2011, Lamar appeared on several high-profile albums including Game's The R.E.D. Album, Tech N9ne's All 6's and 7's, 9th Wonder's The Wonder Years and Canadian recording artist Drake's Grammy Award-winning Take Care, which featured Lamar on a solo track.

2012–2013: Good Kid, M.A.A.D City and controversies

On February 15, 2012, a song by Lamar titled "Cartoon and Cereal," featuring fellow American rapper Gunplay, was leaked online. Lamar later revealed that the track was for his major-label debut studio album and that he had plans to shoot a video for it. Although the song would later be ranked No. 2 in Complex's Best 50 Songs of 2012 list, it would ultimately fail to appear on Lamar's debut. In February 2012, it was announced that Fader had enlisted both Kendrick Lamar and Detroit-based rapper Danny Brown, to appear on the cover of the magazine's Spring Style issue. In February, Lamar also embarked on Drake's Club Paradise Tour, opening along with fellow American rappers ASAP Rocky and 2 Chainz.

In March 2012, MTV announced that Lamar had signed a deal with Interscope Records and Aftermath Entertainment, marking the end of his career as an independent artist. Under the new deal, Lamar's projects, including his album Good Kid, M.A.A.D City, would be jointly released via TDE, Aftermath, and Interscope. Also in March, Lamar appeared on Last Call with Carson Daly, where he spoke on Dr. Dre and his hometown of Compton, California. On April 2, 2012, Lamar premiered his commercial debut single "The Recipe," on Big Boy's Neighborhood at Power 106. The song, which serves as the first single from Good Kid, M.A.A.D City, was released for digital download the following day. The song was produced by West Coast producer Scoop DeVille and features vocals from his mentor Dr. Dre, who also mixed the record.

On May 14, 2012, J. Cole again spoke on his collaborative effort with Lamar. In an interview with Bootleg Kev, Cole stated: "I just started working with Kendrick the other day. We got it in, finally, again. We got maybe four or five [songs] together." On May 21, Lamar made his 106 & Park debut alongside Ace Hood, joining Birdman and Mack Maine on stage to perform "B Boyz". Lamar also talked about his style and sound, Dr. Dre and Snoop Dogg, and his upcoming collaborative LP with J. Cole. On the same date, Lamar released "War Is My Love," an original song written and recorded for the video game Tom Clancy's Ghost Recon: Future Soldier, for which he appeared in a mini promotional clip earlier that month.

On July 31, 2012, TDE, Aftermath, and Interscope serviced "Swimming Pools (Drank)" as the lead single from Lamar's debut album. The song's music video, directed by Jerome D, premiered on August 3, 2012, on 106 & Park. The song peaked at number 17 on the Billboard Hot 100 in its thirteenth week of gradually climbing up the chart. On August 15, 2012, singer Lady Gaga announced via Twitter that both had recorded a song titled "PartyNauseous" for his debut album. However, Gaga withdrew from participation in the last moment, citing that it was due to artistic differences and had nothing to do with Lamar. On August 17, 2012, Lamar released a song titled "Westside, Right on Time," featuring Southern rapper Young Jeezy. The song was released as part of the "Top Dawg Entertainment Fam Appreciation Week". During 2012, Lamar also toured with the rest of Black Hippy and MMG rapper, Stalley, on BET's Music Matters Tour.

Lamar's major-label debut, good kid, m.A.A.d city, was released on October 22, 2012. The album debuted at number two in the US, selling 242,100 copies in its first week. Later that year, Fuse TV listed Lamar's single, "Backseat Freestyle" among the top 40 songs of 2012. In a few months' time, the album was certified gold by the Recording Industry Association of America (RIAA). HipHopDX named Lamar "Emcee of the Year" for their 2012 Year-End honors. In November, after Cole posted pictures of himself and Lamar working in the studio, the latter revealed that the two are still working on a project, but an exact release date was not given for the joint album: "We are going to drop that out the sky though. I don't want to give dates. I'm just going to let it fall" in an interview with the LA Leakers.

On January 26, 2013, Lamar performed the album's first singles "Swimming Pools (Drank)" and "Poetic Justice" on NBC's sketch comedy and variety show, Saturday Night Live. In the same episode, Lamar also appeared alongside guest host Adam Levine and comedy band The Lonely Island, in an SNL Digital Short, which spawned the single "YOLO". On February 22, 2013, Lamar released the video for "Poetic Justice," the Janet Jackson-sampling collaboration with Canadian rapper Drake. On February 26, Lamar performed "Poetic Justice" on the Late Show with David Letterman. Just nine months after its release, good kid, m.A.A.d city was certified platinum by the RIAA, Lamar's first platinum certification.

In August 2013, Lamar's verse on the Big Sean track "Control," made waves across the hip-hop industry. In the verse, Lamar vows to lyrically "murder" every other up-and-coming rapper, namely J. Cole, Big K.R.I.T., Wale, Pusha T, Meek Mill, ASAP Rocky, Drake, Big Sean, Jay Electronica, Tyler, The Creator and Mac Miller. During the song, Lamar also calls himself the "King of New York," which caused controversy among several New York-based rappers. Many New York rappers, including Papoose, The Mad Rapper, Mickey Factz, JR Writer, Mysonne, Joell Ortiz and more, took offense to this. Furthermore, fellow American rappers such as Meek Mill, Lupe Fiasco, Cassidy, Joe Budden, King L, Bizarre and B.o.B, among many others, released a response or diss track, within a week. In the days following the track's release, Lamar's Twitter account saw a 510% increase in followers.

On September 6, 2013, American recording artist and record producer Kanye West announced he would be headlining his first solo tour in five years, in support of his sixth album Yeezus (2013), with Kendrick Lamar accompanying him on tour. The Yeezus Tour began in October. In October, it was also revealed that Lamar would be featured on Eminem's eighth studio album The Marshall Mathers LP 2. On October 15, 2013, Lamar won five awards at the BET Hip Hop Awards, including Album of the Year and Lyricist of the Year (the latter of which he had also won the year before). At the award show, Lamar performed "Money Trees," and was also featured in a cypher alongside his Top Dawg label-mates Jay Rock, Schoolboy Q, Isaiah Rashad, and Ab-Soul. During an October 2013 interview with XXL, Lamar revealed that following The Yeezus Tour, he would begin to start working on his next album.

In November 2013, he was named GQ "Rapper of the Year," and was featured on the cover of the magazine's "Men of the Year" issue. During the interview, he stated that he would begin recording his second major-label studio album in January 2014. Following the issue's release, TDE's CEO Anthony "Top Dawg" Tiffith pulled Lamar from performing at GQs party that accompanies the issue, calling out writer Steve Marsh's profile for its "racial overtones." GQ editor-in-chief Jim Nelson responded with the following statement: "Kendrick Lamar is one of the most talented new musicians to arrive on the scene in years. That's the reason we chose to celebrate him, wrote an incredibly positive article declaring him the next King of Rap, and gave him our highest honor: putting him on the cover of our Men of the Year issue. I'm not sure how you can spin that into a bad thing, and I encourage anyone interested to read the story and see for themselves."

Lamar received a total of seven Grammy nominations at the 56th Annual Grammy Awards (2014), including Best New Artist, Album of the Year, and Best Rap Song, but did not win in any category. Many publications felt that The Recording Academy snubbed Lamar, as well as Seattle-based rapper Macklemore, who won Best Rap Albumcategory for which Lamar was also nominated. At the ceremony, Lamar performed "M.A.A.D City" and a remix of "Radioactive" in a mash-up with American rock band Imagine Dragons at the awards ceremony. The remix was again performed by Lamar and the band on February 1, 2014, during the airing of Saturday Night Live, marking Lamar's second appearance on the show.

2014–2016: To Pimp a Butterfly and Untitled Unmastered

In an interview with Billboard in February 2014, Lamar stated he was planning to put out a new album the next September. During the same interview, which also included Schoolboy Q, Tiffith, and Dave Free, the possibility of a debut effort from the Black Hippy collective appearing in 2014 was announced. On July 31, 2014, it was announced that Lamar would premiere his short film m.A.A.d at Sundance's inaugural NEXT Fest in Los Angeles on August 9. The film is inspired by good kid, m.A.A.d city, and was directed by Kahlil Joseph, who had previously worked with Lamar on the Yeezus Tour. Lamar featured on the Alicia Keys song "It's On Again," which was written for the film The Amazing Spider-Man 2 (2014).

On September 23, 2014, Lamar released "i" as the first single from his third album. On November 15, 2014, Lamar once again appeared on Saturday Night Live as the musical guest, where he performed "i" and "Pay for It," appearing alongside Jay Rock. Through his appearance, with blackout contacts and his braids partly out, Lamar paid homage to New York-based rapper Method Man, whose debut album Tical celebrated its 20th anniversary that day. On December 17, 2014, Lamar debuted a new untitled song on one of the final episodes of The Colbert Report. In early 2015, Lamar won Best Rap Performance and Best Rap Song for his song "i" at the 57th Annual Grammy Awards. On February 9, 2015, he released his third album's second single, titled "The Blacker the Berry". Originally expected to be released on March 23, 2015, his new album To Pimp a Butterfly was released a week early on March 16, 2015, to rave reviews. The album debuted atop the US Billboard 200 chart selling 324,000 copies in its first week, and established Spotify's global first-day streaming record (9.6 million). Lamar was later featured on the cover of Rolling Stone, with editor Josh Eells writing he's "arguably the most talented rapper of his generation."

On May 17, 2015, Lamar featured on the official remix of American singer-songwriter Taylor Swift's song "Bad Blood," as well as appearing in the music video. The original song is in Swift's fifth studio album 1989. The single reached number one on the Billboard Hot 100 and the music video won them a Grammy Award for Best Music Video and a MTV Video Music Award for Video of the Year. To Pimp a Butterfly produced three other singles with accompanying music videos, "King Kunta," "Alright" and "These Walls". The music video for "Alright" received four nominations at the 2015 MTV Video Music Awards, including Video of the Year and Best Male Video. The song "For Free? (Interlude)" also featured a music video, as did "u" with "For Sale" as part of the short film "God Is Gangsta." In October 2015, Lamar announced the Kunta's Groove Sessions Tour, which included eight shows in eight cities. In early 2016, Kanye West released the track "No More Parties in L.A." on his official SoundCloud, a collaboration featuring Lamar and produced by West and Madlib. Lamar also performed a new song, "Untitled 2" on The Tonight Show Starring Jimmy Fallon in January.

Billboard critics commented at the end of the year, "twenty years ago, a conscious rap record wouldn't have penetrated the mainstream in the way Kendrick Lamar did with To Pimp A Butterfly. His sense of timing is impeccable. In the midst of rampant cases of police brutality and racial tension across America, he spews raw, aggressive bars while possibly cutting a rug," while Pitchfork editors noted it "forced critics to think deeply about music. It's an album by the greatest rapper of his generation." Producer Tony Visconti stated David Bowie's album Blackstar (2016) was influenced by Lamar's work, "we were listening to a lot of Kendrick Lamar [...] we loved the fact Kendrick was so open-minded and he didn't do a straight-up hip-hop record. He threw everything on there, and that's exactly what we wanted to do." Visconti also stated this about Lamar while talking about "rule-breakers" in music. "His album To Pimp A Butterfly broke every rule in the book and he had a number one album glued to the top of the charts. You'd think certain labels would learn from that. But they take somebody who is out there and say, 'That's what people want.' No, people want that for one week. You don't want the same song every single day of your life."Lamar won five Grammys at the 58th ceremony, including Best Rap Album for To Pimp a Butterfly. Other nominations included Album of the Year and Song of the Year. At the ceremony, Lamar performed a medley of "The Blacker the Berry" and "Alright". Rolling Stone and Billboard called it the best moment of the night, with the latter writing "It was easily one of the best live TV performances in history."

On March 4, 2016, Lamar released a compilation album Untitled Unmastered, containing eight untitled tracks, each dated. The tracks were unfinished demos from the recording of To Pimp a Butterfly. The compilation album debuted atop the US Billboard 200.

2017–2018: Damn, Black Panther soundtrack and hiatus 

On March 23, 2017, Lamar released a promotional single "The Heart Part 4". A week later, Lamar released the lead single, titled "Humble," accompanied by its music video. On April 7, 2017, his fourth studio album was made available for pre-order and confirmed to be released on April 14, 2017. On April 11, Lamar announced the album title, Damn (stylized as DAMN.), as well as the track list, which confirmed guest appearances by Rihanna, Zacari, and U2. The album was released on April 14, 2017, to rave reviews, with a Rolling Stone writer describing it as a combination of "the old school and the next-level." It marked his third number one album on the Billboard 200 chart, and the single "Humble" became his first number one as a lead artist on the Billboard Hot 100. On May 4, 2017, Damn was certified platinum by the Recording Industry Association of America (RIAA). Lamar later released the DAMN. Collectors Edition in mid-December 2017, with the tracklist from the original album in reverse order.

Along with Tiffith, Lamar produced and curated the film soundtrack for the Marvel Studios superhero film Black Panther (2018), titled Black Panther: The Album. A single from the soundtrack, "All the Stars," was released in January 2018 featuring singer SZA, and it earned him an Academy Award nomination for Best Original Song. Shortly thereafter, another track, titled "King's Dead," was released by Jay Rock featuring Lamar, Future and James Blake. The third single, "Pray For Me," by Lamar and The Weeknd, was released in February 2018, ahead of the album's release in that month. Black Panther: The Album was released on February 9, 2018.

In January 2018, Lamar's song publishing deal with Warner Chappell Music began to expire; TDE was seeking $20 to $40 million for the rapper's catalogue. Lamar opened the 60th Annual Grammy Awards with a medley of "XXX," "Lust," "DNA," "Humble," "King's Dead" and Rich the Kid's "New Freezer". He was also nominated for seven awards, including Album of the Year and Best Rap Album for Damn, and the Record of the Year, Best Rap Performance, Best Rap Song, and Best Music Video for "Humble," and Best Rap/Sung Performance for "Loyalty" with Rihanna. Lamar ultimately won five awards at the ceremony, for Best Rap Album, Best Rap Performance, Best Rap Song, Best Music Video, and Best Rap/Sung Performance. After the Black Panther soundtrack, Lamar did not release music of his own for four years.

2020–present: PGLang and Mr. Morale & the Big Steppers

On March 5, 2020, Lamar and Free launched PGLang, which was described as a multilingual, artist-friendly service company. In a press release, Free claimed that the company "is not a record label, a movie studio, or a publishing house. This is something new. In this overstimulated time, we are focused on cultivating raw expression from grassroots partnerships." The announcement also featured a "visual mission statement," a four-minute short film starring Lamar, Baby Keem, Jorja Smith, and Yara Shahidi.

On August 20, 2021, Lamar announced on a blog post that he was in the middle of producing his final album under TDE. A week later, he appeared on Baby Keem's single "Family Ties," from his debut studio album The Melodic Blue. The song marked Lamar's first single release in three years, and won Best Rap Performance at the 64th Annual Grammy Awards. Lamar additionally made several appearances on The Melodic Blue, on the tracks "Range Brothers" and "Vent". On November 12, Lamar made his comeback performance by headlining the first night of Day N Vegas.

On February 13, 2022, Lamar headlined the Super Bowl LVI halftime show alongside Dr. Dre, Snoop Dogg, Eminem, 50 Cent and Mary J. Blige, which won him the Primetime Emmy Award for Outstanding Variety Special (Live). On May 8, he released the promotional single "The Heart Part 5". Lamar's fifth studio album, Mr. Morale & the Big Steppers, was released on May 13. Ahead of its release, he visited Ghana to shoot a mini documentary with Spotify. He also invited and met music executives and other Ghanaian artists such as Stonebwoy, Amaarae, Black Sherif, and Smallgod during a private album listening party in Accra. In June, he performed at Louis Vuitton's Men's Spring/Summer 2023 show, in honor of their late artistic director Virgil Abloh, inside the Louvre during Paris Fashion Week. He later headlined the final night of the Glastonbury Festival.

Artistry

Influences
Lamar cites Tupac Shakur as his biggest influence, noting that he has impacted his music and everyday life. He has stated that Shakur, the Notorious B.I.G., Jay-Z, Nas and Eminem are his top five favorite rappers. In a 2011 interview with Rolling Stone, Lamar mentioned Mos Def and Snoop Dogg as rappers that he listened to and took influence from during his early years. He also cited DMX as someone who "really [got me started] on music. "That first album [It's Dark and Hell Is Hot] is classic, [so he had an influence on me]." He further added that Eazy-E also influenced him, saying, "I wouldn't be here today if it wasn't for Eazy-E."

In a September 2012 interview, Lamar stated that Eminem "influenced a lot of my style" and has credited him for his own aggression on records such as "Backseat Freestyle". Lamar also gave Lil Wayne's work in Hot Boys credit for influencing his style and praised his longevity. He has said that he also grew up listening to Rakim, Dr. Dre, and Tha Dogg Pound. In January 2013, when asked to name three rappers that have played a role in his style, Lamar said: "It's probably more of a west coast influence. A little bit of Kurupt, [Tupac], with some of the content of Ice Cube." In a November 2013 interview with GQ, when asked who are the four MCs that made him, he answered Shakur, Dr. Dre, Snoop Dogg and Mobb Deep, namely Prodigy. Lamar professed to having been influenced by jazz trumpeter Miles Davis and Parliament-Funkadelic during the recording of To Pimp a Butterfly.

Musical style and rapping technique
Lamar's musical style is known to be "anti-flamboyant, interior and complex." His work is generally categorized as progressive rap due to his contributions of broadening the genre's audience to reach mainstream listeners. He's stated in an interview that "You really can't categorize my music, it's human music." Lamar's debut studio album Section.80 was categorized as conscious hip hop. His second album Good Kid, M.A.A.D City was heavily influenced by West Coast hip hop and 1990s gangsta rap. His next three albums, To Pimp a Butterfly, Damn and Mr. Morale & the Big Steppers, are all classified as conscious hip hop records; with To Pimp a Butterfly incorporating elements of jazz, soul, funk and spoken word poetry, Damn drawing on R&B, pop and psychedelic soul influences, and Mr. Morale & the Big Steppers utilizing minimalist production.

Labeled as a technical rapper by The New York Times, Lamar's "limber and dexterous" flow switches from derivative to generative metrics while incorporating internal and multisyllabic rhyme schemes. He's also known for his "willingness to experiment with his voice," often using cadences to convey complex emotions and tell stories through multiple personas. Tirhakah Love of MTV writes that by expanding his vocal range, Lamar "calls back to a lineage that runs through James Brown's foundational work in the ’60s; the psychedelic ’70s; Prince’s sweaty phantasmagoria in the ’80s; and gangsta rap's run in the ’90s. In each of these eras, artists stretched the human voice in order to challenge listeners to consider the forces residing in our bodies, awaiting a sound to call them to life."

Songwriting 
Lamar's introspective and confessional songwriting is often based on his personal life. He has been branded a "master of storytelling" by The New Yorker, while his lyricism has been described by Billboard as "Shakespearean". Considered a "radio-friendly but overtly political rapper" by Pitchfork, Lamar's writing often contain political and social commentary centered around African American life and culture, exploring themes of racism, black empowerment and social injustice. It has been compared to a State of the Union address by The Guardian. Jacob Uitti of American Songwriter notes, "For as much as he is a musician and a lyricist and an emcee, Lamar is also a playwright, a novelist, a short story author. He’s literary within the art form of music."

All of Lamar's studio albums have been classified as concept albums. Section.80 is themed around Generation Y and dwells on related subjects such as the 1980s crack epidemic, medication tolerance and the presidency of Ronald Reagan. Good Kid, M.A.A.D City is a nonlinear narrative that chronicles Lamar's harsh teenage experiences in his native Compton. To Pimp a Butterfly combines political and personal themes such as racial inequality, depression, and institutional discrimination to document the Black American experience. Damn explores the dualities of human nature and delves into themes of morality and spirituality. Mr. Morale & the Big Steppers details Lamar's experiences in therapy and explores personal themes such as childhood and generational trauma, accountability and celebrity worship.

Controversies

Lyrics 
Lamar's 2015 song "The Blacker the Berry" gathered controversy following the lines, "So why did I weep when Trayvon Martin was in the street, when gang-banging make me kill a nigga blacker than me? Hypocrite!" Some fans perceived the line to be Lamar judging the black community. Lamar later explained the motivation behind the lyric in an NPR interview, saying, "It's not me pointing at my community; it's me pointing at myself, I don't talk about these things if I haven't lived them, and I've hurt people in my life. It's something I still have to think about when I sleep at night."

While Lamar's 2022 song "Auntie Diaries" was met with praise from critics and transgender listeners, the song was also met with heavy criticism due to Lamar's epizeuxis usage of "faggot," as well as deadnaming and misgendering his transgender relative to express his own personal growth from childhood misunderstanding.

Feuds 
In August 2013, Lamar was featured on the song "Control" by Big Sean. In his verse, Lamar called out several rappers, telling them he was going to murder his competition. The verse gathered responses and diss tracks from artists such as Joe Budden, Papoose, Meek Mill, Diddy, Lupe Fiasco, and B.o.B. Rolling Stone called the single "one of the most important hip-hop songs of the last decade".

Lamar has been reported to be in a feud with Drake. Complex called their relationship "complicated," Genius called it a "subliminal war," and GQ called it a "cold war" due to the mass popularity of both artists. Before Lamar's "Control" verse, Lamar had been featured on Drake's "Buried Alive Interlude," Drake was featured on Lamar's single "Poetic Justice," and both were featured on A$AP Rocky's song "Fuckin' Problems". Drake responded to Lamar's "Control" verse in an interview with Billboard, saying, "I know good and well that Kendrick's not murdering me, at all, in any platform."

In September 2013, Drake's third album, Nothing was the Same, was released. Publications such as Complex speculated that Drake had directed subliminal insults at Lamar in the song "The Language". In an interview with Pitchfork a day later, Drake showed disapproval of "Control," saying he wasn't impressed with it and added, "Mind you, it'll go on– Complex and Rap Radar will give it like, verse of the millennium and all that shit or whatever." Drake later said his only competition was Kanye West, after being asked about Kendrick saying he was murdering his competition. Lamar further escalated tensions in the 2013 BET Hip-Hop Awards cypher when he referred to Drake during the cypher, saying, "Yeah, and nothing's been the same since they dropped 'Control' / And tucked a sensitive rapper back in his pajama clothes." Stereogum noted that Lamar was referencing Drake's third studio album, Nothing was the Same, and also Drake being called overly sensitive by the media.

In December 2013, Drake, whilst being interviewed by Vice, said he "stood his ground" and he has to realize "I'm being baited and I'm not gonna fall," then refusing to deny that the line on "The Language" was directed to Lamar, saying he "doesn't want to get into responses". Drake later went on to say that he acknowledged the lines in Lamar's cypher were for him and that it wasn't enough for him to prepare a response before saying they haven't seen each other since the BET cypher. Several more reported subliminal lines were spoken by each rapper, four by Kendrick on the songs, "Pay for it," "King Kunta," "Darkside/Gone," and "Deep Water" and two by Drake on the songs "Used To" and "4PM In Calabasas".

In June 2016, former NFL player and broadcast show host Marcellus Wiley alleged that on his ESPN show, Drake or Lamar had given an interview in which they started "talking noise" and claimed that they had problems with the other individual. The interview was eventually not aired and Wiley said it had been "destroyed". Wiley said that the interview would have escalated the reported feud to become official with diss tracks being directed at the other side. Following an almost year-long hiatus from music, Lamar released "The Heart Part 4". It was speculated that Lamar's line, "One, two, three, four, five / I am the greatest rapper alive" was a response to Drake's line, "I know I said top five, but I'm top two / And I'm not two and I got one" on the song "Gyalchester". Kendrick proceeded to insult rappers who have ghostwriters in an interview with Rolling Stone in August 2015. It was speculated that the insult was directed towards Drake, who has seen controversy due to the use of "ghostwriters" on songs such as "RICO".

Lamar has also feuded with Detroit rapper and former collaborator Big Sean. Following the release of Sean's track "Control" in August 2013 where Lamar calls Sean out and claims he's gonna "murder" him, Sean responded in praise, saying, "Alright, that's what it need to get back to, it need to get back to hip-hop, that culture." In January 2015, Sean later spoke on "Control," saying that the song was "negative" and a month later released the "Me, Myself, and I". In October 2016, Big Sean released "No More Interviews" with shots directed at Lamar.

Spotify 
In May 2018, Anthony "Top Dawg" Tiffith, CEO of Top Dawg Entertainment, contacted Daniel Ek, CEO of Spotify, and the streaming service's head of artist relations Troy Carter to express his frustrations with their Hate Content & Hateful Conduct policy. Conceived in light of the #MeToo movement, the removal policy sought to promote "openness, diversity, tolerance and respect" by removing content that promotes, advocates, or incites hatred and violence against an individual or group based on characteristics. In accordance to the policy, the streaming platform removed XXXTentacion and R. Kelly's music their editorial and algorithmic playlists due to their publicized acts of violence against women. Tiffith claimed that the policy was censorship and threatened to pull music from his label, including Lamar's, from the platform if they kept the policy as it stood. In the midst of Tiffith's threat, Lamar praised XXXTentacion's debut studio album 17 on Twitter. In response to the criticism, Spotify reversed their policy and reinstated XXXTentacion's music back onto playlists after other artists threatened to pull their music.

Other ventures

Acting and filmmaking 
Lamar began his filmmaking career by writing the music video for his song "Ignorance Is Bliss". He made his directorial debut with the music video for "Backseat Freestyle". Since then, he has directed several of his music videos alongside his creative partner Dave Free under the collective name The Little Homies. In 2014, Lamar produced and was featured in M.A.A.D, a short film inspired by his second studio album Good Kid, M.A.A.D City. In December 2015, he co-directed, edited and starred in the short film God Is Gangsta, which was inspired by his third studio album To Pimp a Butterfly. He began executive producing music videos in 2020 with Baby Keem's "Hooligan". In January 2022, Lamar and Free announced that they will be producing an untitled comedy film with South Park creators Matt Stone and Trey Parker.

In July 2018, Lamar made his acting debut in the fifth season of the Starz drama series Power, portraying a Dominican drug addict named Laces. His casting stemmed from his friendship with rapper 50 Cent, who stars in and executive produces the series. Lamar wanted to portray a character that did not resemble his musical persona, and drew inspiration from various people he knew when growing up in Compton. He also compared his acting preparation to his songwriting, saying that he prefers to "always have that open space to evolve". Lamar's performance was praised by critics and viewers, and earned him an NAACP Image Award nomination for Outstanding Guest Performance in a Comedy or Drama Series.

Business and fashion 
Lamar owns a percentage of his former record label Top Dawg Entertainment. In December 2014, he was announced as a brand ambassador for sportswear brand Reebok, and designed six sneakers with the company. After ending his ambassadorship with Reebok in 2017, Lamar began a partnership with Nike and collaborated on five sneakers. In 2022, he collaborated with Converse on two sneakers.

Impact
Lamar's work has earned universal acclaim from music critics, industry peers, and cultural figures. He has been named by numerous media outlets as one of the most influential artists of the 2010s, with Billboard listing him as one of the greatest rappers of all time. He has been credited by NPR Music with the revival of jazz rap, which waned after the 1990s. Writing for Esquire UK, editor Olivia Ovended opined, "Even if you're not overly familiar with Lamar's back catalogue, his influence in music is everywhere, from the West Coast hip-hop now being made by Anderson .Paak. to the trap of Gucci Mane. He is—and we'll brook no argument here—the greatest rapper making music today." The New Yorker journalist Carrie Battan considered him "California's biggest hip-hop artist since the nineteen-nineties." Lamar has been branded as the "New King of Hip Hop" numerous times by media outlets. Steve Batlin of Forbes writes that although he "may or may not be the greatest rapper alive right now," he's "certainly in the very short lists of artists in the conversation." Lamar frequently refers to himself as the "Greatest Rapper Alive" and has once declared himself the "King of New York".

His music was also used during protests following the 2016 United States presidential election. According to American studies and media scholar William Hoynes, Lamar's progressive rap music places him in a long line of African-American artists and activists who "worked both inside and outside of the mainstream to advance a counterculture that opposes the racist stereotypes being propagated in white-owned media and culture". History.com considered Lamar's Pulitzer Prize win as "a sign of the American cultural elite's recognition of hip-hop as a legitimate artistic medium." NPR Music writer Marcus J. Moore noticed Lamar's rap-jazz aesthetic present on his repertoire, "he's at the vanguard of this movement, proving that he too is a rule breaker, just like Miles, Herbie, Coltrane, Glasper and Hargove, who all took bold creative risks to push jazz into uncharted territory," and stated that Lamar is introducing jazz to a generation "who might only know it through their parents' old record collections." Esquire US writer Matt Miller opined about the rapper's videography in 2017, crediting Lamar for "reviving" the music video as "a powerful form" of social commentary, citing as examples "Alright" and "Humble".

Multiple artists have cited his work as an inspiration, including Khalid, Roddy Ricch, Christine and the Queens, Jhené Aiko, Cordae, Car Seat Headrest and Dua Lipa. Madonna praised Mr. Morale & the Big Steppers as "history making" and "mind-bogglingly brilliant". Pharrell Williams called Lamar "one of the greatest writers of our times," explaining that he "knows how to be very disciplined with a subject matter, he knows that stickiness is important, and he knows that it has to feel great." Lorde described him as "the most popular and influential artist in modern music". David Bowie's final studio album Blackstar (2016) was influenced by To Pimp a Butterfly, which was noted by Rolling Stone as one of the albums that made Lamar "the decade's deepest, rangiest, most musical and consequential rapper."

Achievements

Lamar has won seventeen Grammy Awards. At the 57th Grammy Awards in 2015, his single "i" earned him his first two wins: Best Rap Song and Best Rap Performance. At the 58th Grammy Awards, Lamar led the list of nominations with 11 mentions, passing Eminem and Kanye West as the rapper with the most nominations in a single night, and second overall behind Michael Jackson and Babyface, who hold the record of 12 nominations. Lamar was the most-awarded artist at the ceremony with five. good kid, m.A.A.d city, To Pimp a Butterfly and Damn have all been nominated for Album of the Year, with the latter two winning for Best Rap Album. Those three albums were featured on Rolling Stones industry-voted list of the 500 Greatest Albums of All Time in 2020. DAMN. won the 2018 Pulitzer Prize for Music, making Lamar the first non-jazz or classical artist to win the award. In collecting his award on May 30, 2018, new Pulitzer administrator Dana Canedy, the first woman and African American to lead the organization, told him: "Congratulations, looks like we're both making history this year." In 2019, he was nominated for the Academy Award for Best Original Song for "All the Stars". At the 74th Primetime Emmy Awards, he won Outstanding Variety Special (Live) for the Super Bowl LVI halftime show.

Lamar has received two honors in his hometown. On May 11, 2015, he received the California State Senate's Generational Icon Award from State Senator Isadore Hall III (D–Compton) who represents California's 35th district. From the senate floor, Lamar told the legislature, "Being from the City of Compton and knowing the parks that I played at and the neighborhoods, I always thought how great the opportunity would be to give back to my community off of what I do in music." On February 13, 2016, Mayor of Compton, California Aja Brown presented Lamar with the key to the city, for "representing Compton's evolution, embodying the New Vision for Compton."

He appeared for the first time on the Time 100 list of most influential people in 2016. His debut major-label release, good kid, m.A.A.d city, was named one of "The 100 Best Debut Albums of All Time" by Rolling Stone. To Pimp a Butterfly was ranked by many publications as one of the best albums of the 2010s (decade), with The Independent placing it first. In 2015, Billboard included Lamar in "The 10 Greatest Rappers of All-Time." Complex magazine has ranked Lamar atop "The 20 Best Rappers in Their 20s" annual lists in 2013, 2015 and 2016. He has also won six Billboard Music Awards, seven BET Awards (including Album of the Year), and 25 BET Hip Hop Awards—the most for an artist.

Personal life

While attending Centennial High School, Lamar began dating beautician Whitney Alford. In April 2015, during an interview with The Breakfast Club, Lamar revealed that they were engaged. The couple have two children together: daughter Uzi (born July 2019), and son Enoch. Lamar is an older cousin of fellow rapper Baby Keem, and a younger cousin of basketball player Nick Young. He is a notable fan of the Los Angeles Lakers, the Los Angeles Dodgers, and the Los Angeles Rams.

Lamar is a devout Christian, having converted following the death of a friend. He has been outspoken about his faith in his music and interviews. He has been baptized twice; first when he was 16 and again in 2013, which he announced during his opening set at Kanye West's The Yeezus Tour. Lamar has credited God for his fame and his "deliverance" from crime that often plagued Compton in the 1990s. He also believes his career is divinely inspired, saying in an interview with Complex in 2014, "I got a greater purpose, God put something in my heart to get across and that's what I'm going to focus on, using my voice as an instrument and doing what needs to be done." The introductory lines to his second studio album Good Kid, M.A.A.D City (2012) includes a form of the Sinner's Prayer. His song "I" and his fourth studio album Damn (2017) further discusses his Christian faith and spiritual struggles. In 2014, Lamar dressed up as Jesus for Halloween, explaining, "If I want to idolize somebody, I'm not going to do a scary monster, I'm not gonna do another artist or a human being—I'm gonna idolize the Master, who I feel is the Master, and try to walk in His light. It's hard, it's something I probably could never do, but I'm gonna try. Not just with the outfit but with everyday life. The outfit is just the imagery, but what's inside me will display longer." On the cover of Mr. Morale & the Big Steppers (2022) and during select promotions for the album, Lamar wore a diamond crown of thorns designed by Tiffany & Co.. During his headlining performance at Glastonbury Festival, Lamar explained that he wore the crown as both a "nod of respect to the artists who came before him" and as a reminder of his imperfections, while adding, "They judge you, they judged Christ." He repeated the chant at the end of his performance with theatrical blood pouring down his face; this time, he added "Godspeed for women's rights" in response to the overturning of Roe v. Wade.

In the lead up to the 2012 presidential election, Lamar stated, "I don't vote. I don't do no voting, I will keep it straight up real with you. I don't believe in none of the shit that's going on in the world." He went on to say that voting was useless: "When I say the president can't even control the world, then you definitely know there's something else out there pushing the buttons. They could do whatever they want to do, we['re] all puppets." Several days before the election, he reversed his previous claim that he was not going to vote and said that he was voting for Barack Obama because Mitt Romney did not have a "good heart". Lamar later met Obama in January 2016 in promotion of Obama's My Brother's Keeper Challenge. Speaking about the meeting, Lamar said, "We tend to forget that people who've attained a certain position are human." Before the meeting, Obama said in an interview that his favorite song of 2015 was Lamar's "How Much a Dollar Cost".

DiscographyStudio albums Section.80 (2011) 
 Good Kid, M.A.A.D City (2012)
 To Pimp a Butterfly (2015)
 Damn (2017)
 Mr. Morale & the Big Steppers (2022)

Filmography
 Film 

 Television 

Concert toursHeadliningSection.80 Tour (2011)
Good Kid, M.A.A.D City World Tour (2013)
Kunta Groove Sessions Tour (2015)
The Damn Tour (2017–18)
The Big Steppers Tour (2022)Co-headliningThe Championship Tour  (2018)Supporting'
Kanye West – The Yeezus Tour (2013–14)
Drake – Club Paradise Tour (2012)

See also

 List of artists who reached number one in the United States
 List of artists who reached number one on the U.S. Rhythmic chart
 List of hip hop musicians
 List of people from California
 Music of California

References

External links

 

 
1987 births
Living people
21st-century American rappers
African-American Christians
African-American male rappers
African-American male songwriters
African-American record producers
Aftermath Entertainment artists
American hip hop record producers
American hip hop singers
American music video directors
Black Hippy members
Brit Award winners
Converts to Christianity
Creative directors
Filmmakers from California
Grammy Award winners for rap music
Interscope Records artists
Juno Award for International Album of the Year winners
MTV Europe Music Award winners
Musicians from Compton, California
PGLang artists
Primetime Emmy Award winners
Pulitzer Prize for Music winners
Rappers from California
Record producers from California
Songwriters from California
Top Dawg Entertainment artists
West Coast hip hop musicians